Berthold-Auerbach-Literaturpreis is a literary prize of 2,500 euros awarded in Baden-Württemberg, Germany. It is awarded every 5 years "for literary works that are thematically or stylistically in the tradition of Berthold Auerbach or for his ideals."

Selected winners 
 1982 Klaus Dieter Lauer
 1997 Walle Sayer
 2002 Kurt Oesterle
 2007 Egon Gramer
 2012 Susann Pásztor
 2017 Hermann Kinder

References

Literary awards of Baden-Württemberg